Laya (Dzongkha: ལ་ཡ་ཁ་, ལ་ཡག་ཁ་; Wylie: la-ya-kha, la-yag-kha) is a Tibetic variety spoken by indigenous Layaps inhabiting the high mountains of northwest Bhutan in the village of Laya, Gasa District. Speakers also inhabit the northern regions of Thimphu (Lingzhi Gewog) and Punakha Districts. Its speakers are ethnically related to the Tibetans. Laya speakers are also called Bjop by the Bhutanese, sometimes considered a condescending term. There were 1,100 speakers of Laya in 2003.

Laya is a variety of Dzongkha, the national language of Bhutan. There is a limited mutual intelligibility with Dzongkha, mostly in basic vocabulary and grammar.

See also
 Layap
 Laya Gewog
 Laya village
 Languages of Bhutan

References

Languages of Bhutan
Languages written in Tibetan script